No Escape, released in some countries as Escape from Absolom and Absolom 2022, is a 1994 American science fiction action film directed by Martin Campbell. It stars Ray Liotta, Lance Henriksen, Stuart Wilson, Kevin Dillon, Michael Lerner and Ernie Hudson. It was based on the 1987 novel The Penal Colony by Richard Herley. In a dystopian future, a former Reconnaissance Marine serves life imprisonment on an island inhabited by savage and cannibalistic prisoners.

It was the first film collaboration between the director Martin Campbell and actor Stuart Wilson, who both later worked in The Mask of Zorro and Vertical Limit, both released in 1998 and 2000, and the film was also the third collaboration between the producer Hurd and Henriksen, after The Terminator and Aliens, both directed by James Cameron, and released in 1984 and 1986.

Plot 
In 2022, the penal system is run by corporations, and prisoners are seen as assets. Highly-trained ex-Marine John Robbins is imprisoned for life for murdering his commanding officer after being ordered to kill innocent civilians in Benghazi; having escaped from two Level 5 maximum security prisons, he is sent to a Level 6 facility. A fellow prisoner tells him about "Absolom", an island where they send the worst prisoners and is feared more than the prison. The Warden, after being held at gunpoint by Robbins, is convinced that he is a threat and exiles him to the island.

On the island, Robbins is captured by a group of prisoners known as the Outsiders, led by a sociopath named Walter Marek and whose only rule is The Law of the Jungle. The abandoned island resort, complete with dilapidated houses and a swimming pool, is where the Outsiders have established a base. Marek forces Robbins to fight one of his men for amusement and is impressed when Robbins kills his opponent in seconds. He offers him a position in his gang; instead, Robbins knocks Marek into the pool, steals his rocket launcher, and flees the Outsider's camp. He is pursued through the jungle and cornered at the edge of a high cliff before being shot in the neck by blowgun darts. After falling into the river below, another prisoner group called the Insiders retrieves him.

Led by a terminally-ill doctor called the Father, the Insiders established a cooperative autonomous community with laws as opposed to the tyranny of the Outsiders. Robbins meets Father; King, the new-arrival helper; and befriends Casey, a naïve young man given a life sentence for a kidnapping which led to a dual felony murder accidentally when the hostages died. Robbins learns that the Insiders are heavily outnumbered by the Outsiders and that he is the only person to have ever escaped from Marek's camp. The weapon he stole is appropriated for the good of the community.

After helping repel an attack by the Outsiders, Father notes Robbins' abilities and asks him to join them. He refuses, saying he wants to leave Absolom; Father takes Robbins to the shore, explaining that they are 200 miles from the mainland. Gunships patrol 50 miles off the coast, and infrared satellite technology monitors thermal activity, such as large fires or explosions.

The Insiders have secretly built a scan-proof boat and launch it to tell the outside world about Absolom. However, the boat is destroyed by attack helicopters, causing Father to believe there is an informer among them.

Robbins learns about a new boat and demands a seat, still determined to escape. After learning that the engine needs a distributor, a part Robbins saw while in Marek's camp, he offers to retrieve it in exchange for passage; the Insiders agree. Casey follows Robbins, who infiltrates the Outsiders' camp and gets the engine part, but they are captured by the Outsiders. Robbins is forced to fight Casey to the death. Knowing they won't both escape, Casey impales himself on Robbins' weapon. Robbins escapes a planned execution with the help of an Insider spy, infuriating Marek.

Knowing Marek will attack, and over stern objections, Robbins convinces the Insiders to abandon their camp, but not before lacing it with booby traps. He stays behind to fire the stolen rocket launcher, igniting an incendiary bomb. Most of the Outsiders die, and the Warden intervenes when the satellites are triggered. Father dies while defending Robbins from Marek. After Robbins kills Marek, he finds the new boat incinerated and evidence that King has killed the engineer. Robbins forces King to give new coordinates to the Warden for where to land his helicopter on the island. Robbins hijacks the helicopter, throws the Warden out, and vows to spread the truth. King and the Warden are left behind as unseen Outsiders close in on them.

Cast 

 Ray Liotta as John Robbins
 Lance Henriksen as The Father
 Stuart Wilson as Walter Marek
 Kevin Dillon as Casey
 Kevin J. O'Connor as Stephano
 Don Henderson as Killian
 Ian McNeice as Tom King
 Jack Shepherd as Dysart
 Michael Lerner as Warden
 Ernie Hudson as Hawkins
 Russell Kiefel as Iceman
 Brian M. Logan as Scab
 Cheuk-Fai Chan as Skull
 David Wenham as Hotel Guard
 David Argue as the Cellmate
 Stan Kouros as NCO

Reception 
No Escape holds a rating of 60% on Rotten Tomatoes based on 20 reviews; the average rating is 5.3/10.

The film grossed $15.3 million in the United States and Canada and $22.4 million worldwide.

Merchandise 

A video game based on the film of the same name  was released in 1994 for Sega Genesis & Super Nintendo Entertainment System. A Sega CD version was planned and even advertised, but was cancelled for unknown reasons. Marvel Comics published a three-issue comic book miniseries that adapted the original novel and the film's script, the series had Roger Salick as a writer, Mike Harris as a cartoonist, and Chris Ivy as an inker.

Home media
No Escape was released on VHS and Laserdisc in 1994, the VHS was re-released on April 14, 1998. The DVD was released by HBO on July 29, 1998. Columbia TriStar also released the film on DVD, VHS and Laserdisc in other countries from 1995–2003, while Sony Pictures Home Entertainment re-released the DVDs in 2005–2017. The DVD was released in United Kingdom on October 3, 2003 by Pathé. The film was first released on Blu-ray in Germany by Nameless Media (under the label of SPHE) in 2017, and includes with Mediabook covers. On July 4, 2018, the film was released on Blu-ray and DVD by Umbrella Entertainment in Australia, and includes four TV Spots and Trailer. Unearthed Films released the film on Blu-ray with Special Features for the North American releases in October 2022.

See also 
 List of films featuring surveillance
 List of prison films
 Private prison
 Prison-industrial complex

References

External links 
 
 
 
 Review by Time Out

1994 films
1990s science fiction action films
American science fiction action films
Films about cannibalism
Films set in 2022
1990s prison films
Films about the United States Marine Corps
Savoy Pictures films
Columbia Pictures films
Films directed by Martin Campbell
Films scored by Graeme Revell
Films set on fictional islands
1990s English-language films
1990s American films